The 1st Alaska State Legislature served during 1959 and 1960. All of its members were elected on November 25, 1958, when Alaska was in its last days as a territory.

Terms
The Alaska Constitution established that legislative terms begin on the fourth Monday in January following an election year, and that the date may be changed by statute. This legislature passed Senate Bill 70 in the first session, which placed the date into statute but did not actually change it.

All terms began on January 26, 1959
All terms of representatives, and of those senators serving short terms, expired on January 22, 1961
All terms of senators serving long terms expired on January 27, 1963

Sessions
1st session: January 26, 1959 – April 16, 1959
2nd session: January 25, 1960 – March 29, 1960

Alaska Senate

Make-up

Members

Leadership
Senate President: William E. Beltz (D-Unalakleet)

Alaska House of Representatives

Make-up

Members

Leadership
Speaker of the House: Warren A. Taylor (D-Fairbanks)

See also
 List of Alaska State Legislatures
 2nd Alaska State Legislature, the legislature following this one
 List of governors of Alaska
 List of speakers of the Alaska House of Representatives
 {AKLeg.gov}

Notes

External links
Photos of individual and assembled members of the 1st Alaska State Legislature, as hosted at Alaska's Digital Archives
 Senate, in chambers
 Senate, on capitol steps
 Senate, collage of official photos
 House, in chambers
 House, on capitol steps
 House, collage of official photos
 Members of the 1st State Legislature who were also members of the 23rd Territorial Legislature
 Legislative staff
 William E. Beltz, Irene E. Ryan and Warren A. Taylor conferring
 William E. Beltz at Senate President's desk
 Howard C. Bradshaw
 Frank E. Cashel
 Frank X. Chapados
 John B. "Jack" Coghill
 Blanche L. (Preston) McSmith
 Ralph E. Moody accepting formal acknowledgement of Alaskan statehood in Boston, Massachusetts, September 1958
 Thomas B. Stewart

1959 establishments in Alaska
Alaska
1960 in Alaska
Alaska
1961 disestablishments in Alaska
01